Saak is a 2019 Indian Punjabi-language romantic drama film written and directed by Kamaljit Singh. The film is produced by Jatinder Jay Minhas, Rupinder Preet Minhas, under banners Minhas Films Pvt Ltd and Minhas Lawyers LLP Presentation. It stars Jobanpreet Singh, Mandy Takhar and set in backdrop of 1947, it follows the story of an armyman who falls in love with a girl whose parents don't like armyman as their son-in-law. It was released on 6 September 2019. and

Plot
The film revolves around the love story of Fauji Karam Singh and Chann Kaur. They both want to marry each other but the Chann’s father detests the idea of marrying his daughter to a soldier owing to previous martyr of his brother in law and the plight of his widowed sister. However the couple marry and hoodwink the girl’s sire and the entire village by framing a secret mission story. When the big revelation happens, the war has already started and Karam decides to leave for the country’s sake. Chann’s father decides that her vidai will only take place when Karam returns. It is shown that he has gone missing and doesn't return but later it is revealed that he us alive and happily brings his bride home.

Cast
 Mandy Takhar as Chann Kaur
 Jobanpreet Singh as Karam Singh
 Mukul Dev as Bhola 
 Prithvi Raaj Sidhu as Karam’s Nephew

Release 
The official teaser was released by White Hill Music on 6 August 2019. The official trailer of the film was released by White Hill Music on 15 August 2019.

The film has been certified with a runtime of 121 mins by British Board of Film Classification and was theatrically released on 6 September 2019.

Critical response 
Gurnaaz Kaur of The Tribune gave two out of five stars and opined that the depiction of vintage Punjabi culture stood out in the film. Gurnaaz praised the performance of Jobanpreet, and said, "It would be fair to say that he carries the film on his shoulders." Criticising slowness of plot, the dialogues and acting, the critic felt that climax was predictable and not exciting. Gurnaaz concluded, "Saak could have been a better film if it wasn’t so stretched and if its actors were utilised well."

Soundtrack 

The songs are composed by Onkar Minhas and Qaistrax on lyrics of Veet Baljit and Kartar Kamal.

References

External links
 

2019 films
Punjabi-language Indian films
2010s Punjabi-language films
Indian romantic drama films
Films set in 1947
Films set in Punjab, India
2019 romantic drama films